Drum 'n' Bass for Papa is a studio album by Luke Vibert, released under the alias Plug. It was originally released by Blue Planet Recordings in 1996, and in 1997 on Trent Reznor's Nothing Records with the bonus addition of Vibert's previous three Plug EPs.

NME listed it as the 33rd best album of 1996. Writing for Chicago Reader, Peter Margasak listed it as the 9th best album of 1996.

Release
Originally released by Blue Planet Recordings in 1996, the album has gone through several different releases.

The first was a CD release with an additional bonus disc, titled Drum 'n' Bass for Papa + Special Edition CD, released in 1997. It had different cover art and the discs were colored dark blue instead of the original sepia tone.

The album was released again on Trent Reznor's label Nothing Records on 9 September 1997. It was a double album on CD, which included the songs from the previously released EPs. This version of the album had the same cover as the Special Edition version but changed "Special Edition CD" to "Plug EP's 1, 2 & 3" for the title. It was released under the title Drum 'n' Bass for Papa + Plug EP's 1, 2 & 3. The other difference in this version was that the import included the track "The Life of the Mind", which wasn't included on the album due to problems with a sample clearance.

Track listing
All tracks written by Luke Vibert.

References

External links
 

1996 albums
Luke Vibert albums
Nothing Records albums